The license plates in Cape Verde have been derived from the former colonial power Portugal.

Old System

Previously, Cape Verde used the Portuguese Overseas Territories system, cars in Cape Verde had registrations of the type CVx-1234, where the x was either S (Ilhas de Sotavento) or B (Ilhas de Barlavento). Sotavento and Barlavento are the two island groups that make up Cape Verde. Plates were black with white letters.

New System

The modern system keeps the colours of the old system (white letters on black ground), but the registration code is now different for each island. The codes are:
BR - Brava
BV - Boa Vista
FG - Fogo
SA - Santo Antão
SL - Sal
SN - São Nicolau
ST - Santiago
SV - São Vicente

The format is AB-12-CD, where AB is the regional code. Vehicles of the Armed Forces bear registration plates of the type "FA-12-34". 

Diplomatic plates are white with red letters and usually have the format "CD-12-345" where the first number block stands for the represented country, e.g. 16 for the USA. Vehicles of the United Nations have "CD-ONU-123".

Motor cycles of the municipal administration of Praia have white-on-black plates of the format "CMP 12" where CMP stands for "Câmara Municipal da Praia".

In adaption to the European system, registration plates can also be decorated with variations of the national flag of Cape Verde on the left. The font of the plates (at least of private vehicles) can be freely chosen.

The official car of the president of the republic is registered as "PR CV". Other government vehicles have yellow plates with black letters, sometimes with the letter "G" added at the end.

For special vehicles, green and red plates with white letters are issued.

External links
 Cabo Verde license plates (in Spanish)

Cape Verde
Transport in Cape Verde
Cape Verde transport-related lists